Senator Bellamy may refer to:

Carol Bellamy (born 1942), New York State Senate
John Dillard Bellamy (1854–1942), North Carolina State Senate